Les Girls (also known as Cole Porter's Les Girls) is a 1957 American CinemaScope musical comedy film directed by George Cukor and produced by Sol C. Siegel, with Saul Chaplin as associate producer. The screenplay by John Patrick was based on a story by Vera Caspary. The music and lyrics were by Cole Porter.

It stars Gene Kelly, Mitzi Gaynor, Kay Kendall, and Taina Elg, and the cast also includes Jacques Bergerac, Leslie Phillips, Henry Daniell, and Patrick Macnee.

Premise
After writing a tell-all book about her days in the dance troupe "Barry Nichols and Les Girls", Sybil Wren (Kay Kendall) is sued for libeling her fellow dancer Angele (Taina Elg). A Rashomon-style narrative presents the story from three points of view. Sybil accuses Angele of having an affair with Barry (Gene Kelly). Angele insists that it was actually Sybil who was having the affair. Finally, Barry gives his side of the story.

Cast
 Gene Kelly as Barry Nichols
 Mitzi Gaynor as Joy Henderson
 Kay Kendall as Lady Sybil Wren
 Betty Wand provides the singing voice of Lady Sybil Wren
 Taina Elg as Angele Ducros
 Jacques Bergerac as Pierre Ducros
 Leslie Phillips as Sir Gerald Wren
 Henry Daniell as judge
 Patrick Macnee as Sir Percy
 Stephen Vercoe as Mr. Outward
 Philip Tonge as associate judge
 Barrie Chase as dancer

Background notes
 The story by Vera Caspary was inspired by an article which appeared in The Atlantic – a reminiscence of a dancer's touring years. Miss Caspary's version turned the memoir into a point of dispute and raised questions about the nature of truth. As only the title was used from Miss Caspary's story for the screenplay, she joked that she was the highest paid writer in the world, as she was paid $80,000 for writing just two words – "Les Girls"
Les Girls was Gene Kelly's last musical under his contract at MGM which began in 1942.
Les Girls was the last film score by Cole Porter and the next-to-last score of his career.
The film's original female leads were to have been played by Leslie Caron, Cyd Charisse, Jean Simmons and Carol Haney.

Awards and honors
 Les Girls won the Academy Award for Best Costume Design for Orry-Kelly and was nominated for two other awards, Best Art Direction (William A. Horning, Gene Allen, Edwin B. Willis, Richard Pefferle) and Best Sound (Wesley C. Miller).
 The film won the Golden Globe for Best Motion Picture – Musical/Comedy and for Best Actress, Kay Kendall and Taina Elg together.
 2006: AFI's Greatest Movie Musicals – nominated

Sequel
Immediately after the film was released tentative plans were announced for a sequel called Les Boys. While it did not come to pass, it did inspire Harry's Girls, a sitcom starring Larry Blyden which ran on NBC for 15 episodes in the fall of 1963.

Box office
According to MGM records the film made $2,415,000 in the US and Canada and $1,450,000 elsewhere, but because of its high production cost lost $1,635,000.

Choreography
Les Girls was a major vehicle for choreographer Jack Cole, and one of the first films to feature the role of choreographer in the opening credits.

See also
 List of American films of 1957

References

External links
 
 
 
 

1957 films
1957 musical comedy films
CinemaScope films
American musical comedy films
Best Musical or Comedy Picture Golden Globe winners
Films based on works by Vera Caspary
Films directed by George Cukor
Films featuring a Best Musical or Comedy Actress Golden Globe winning performance
Films produced by Sol C. Siegel
Films scored by Cole Porter
Films that won the Best Costume Design Academy Award
Metro-Goldwyn-Mayer films
1950s English-language films
1950s American films